NDN can mean:

 NDN (gene), a gene found on chromosome 15 in humans and chromosome 7 in mice
 Named data networking, a NSF-funded future internet architecture research project 
 New Democrat Network,  an American think tank that promotes "centrist" Democratic candidates
 Nigel Desmond Norman (1929–2002), British aircraft designer, his company NDN Aircraft, and their products:
 NDN Firecracker, a single-engine aircraft designed as a military trainer
 NDN Fieldmaster, a British agricultural aircraft of the 1980s
 Shorthand spelling for Indian, a term that some Native Americans in the United States and some First Nations peoples in Canada use to refer to themselves
 Necromancer's DOS Navigator, an orthodox file manager for DOS
 Northern Distribution Network, part of NATO logistics in the Afghan War
 Neodymium nitride, a chemical with the symbol NdN.